The Hong Kong Philharmonic Orchestra (Cantonese: 香港管弦樂團), commonly abbreviated as HKPO or HKPhil (Cantonese: 港樂), is the largest symphony orchestra in Hong Kong. First established in 1947 as an amateur orchestra under the name Sino-British Orchestra (中英管弦樂團), it was renamed the Hong Kong Philharmonic Orchestra in 1957 and became a professional orchestra in 1974 under the funding of the government.

History

Sino-British Orchestra
Sino-British Club was an organisation founded in 1946, aimed at promoting harmony among different groups in Hong Kong (especially British and native Hongkongese) through cultural activities. Various groups were found under the club, including drama, literature, film, and music.

In 1947, Anthony Braga, one of the leaders of the music group of Sino-British Club, suggested to form a symphony orchestra to gather instrumentalists in the city and provide musical performance to the citizens, as the society was still recovering from the World War II. About 20 amateur musicians were found, and a chamber orchestra was formed quickly. Weekly rehearsal started in the summer.

Solomon Bard, a violinist who just finished his medical degree in the UK, returned to Hong Kong in the autumn of 1947, and was invited by Braga to be the conductor of the orchestra. Bard took over the orchestra, and conducted its debut performance on 30 April 1948 in St. Stephen's Girls' College.

Arrigo Foa
Bard continued his directorship of the orchestra after the debut. In 1953, Bard invited the Italian violinist and conductor Arrigo Foa to take over the orchestra, and Bard worked as the concertmaster and deputy conductor of the Orchestra.

Foa was a professional musician who joined Shanghai Municipal Orchestra as concertmaster in 1919. He succeeded Mario Paci as the conductor of the Shanghai orchestra in 1942, under the Japanese occupation. Foa migrated to Hong Kong in 1953 and led the orchestra immediately. He led the orchestra to play a critically acclaimed concert with pianist Louis Kentner.

Under the professional training of Foa, the orchestra improved rapidly, and gained a higher reputation in the city. Collaborating artists included pianist Julius Katchen and violinist Ruggiero Ricci.

Hong Kong Philharmonic Orchestra
In 1957, members of the orchestra decided to separate the group from Sino-British Club. As an independent organisation, the orchestra was renamed to the Hong Kong Philharmonic Orchestra, and registered as the Hong Kong Philharmonic Society. Most of the musicians remained, and Foa and Bard stayed on the same positions in the new ensemble.

In 1974, Hong Kong Philharmonic Orchestra became the first professional orchestra in Hong Kong, while the Sino-British Club dismissed in the same year.

The orchestra now gives more than 140 performances annually to an audience of over 180,000. International musicians who have collaborated with the orchestra in recent years include:

 pianists Yuja Wang, Lang Lang, Yundi Li, Stephen Hough, Garrick Ohlsson, Ingrid Fliter, Haochen Zhang, Louis Lortie, Jean-Efflam Bavouzet, Nikolai Lugansky, Boris Berezovsky, Yefim Bronfman, Behzod Abduraimov, Rachel Cheung, Emmanuel Ax and Jean-Yves Thibaudet
 violinists Midori Gotō, Anne-Sophie Mutter, Vadim Repin, Ning Feng, Tianwa Yang, James Ehnes, Akiko Suwanai, Maxim Vengerov, Zia Shin, Renaud Capuçon and Frank Peter Zimmermann
 cellists Jian Wang, Yo-Yo Ma, Paul Watkins, Sol Gabetta and Alban Gerhardt
 oboist François Leleux
 vocalists Hui He, Sumi Jo, Anna Caterina Antonacci, Deborah Voigt, Susan Graham, Simon O'Neill, Inger Dam-Jensen, Shenyang, and Matthias Goerne 
 guest conductors Antoni Wit, Andreas Delfs, Christophe Rousset, Nicholas McGegan, David Zinman, Vladimir Ashkenazy, Lorin Maazel, Gennady Rozhdestvensky, Xian Zhang, Yu Long, Benjamin Northey, Christoph Eschenbach, Charles Dutoit, John Wilson, Vassily Sinaisky, Lawrence Foster, Jun Märkl, Thomas Dausgaard, Carlo Rizzi, Martyn Brabbins, Hans Graf and Elim Chan.

In addition to classical performances, the orchestra occasionally appears backing local pop stars such as Hacken Lee, Jacky Cheung, Frances Yip, Teresa Carpio, Leehom Wang and Hins Cheung.

Touring record
In February 1986, the HKPO made its debut tour of several cities in the People's Republic of China, with conductor Kenneth Schermerhorn and soloists Stephanie Chase (violin) and Li Jian (piano). In the autumn of 1995, the HKPO travelled to nine cities in the United States and Canada in its North American début under conductor David Atherton.  In 2003, the orchestra made its European début with performances in London's Barbican Hall, Belfast, Dublin and Paris (Théâtre des Champs-Élysées).

The orchestra finished a five-country tour in Europe in 2015, with performances in London, Zürich, Eindhoven, Birmingham, Berlin and Amsterdam, as well as a filmed performance at the Musikverein in Vienna. In 2017, the orchestra toured Asia and Oceania with performances in Seoul, Osaka, Singapore, Melbourne and Sydney which received high acclaim; and also performed a staged version of Die Walküre in the Beijing Music Festival with a co-production team from Beijing and Salzburg.

Recording history
The orchestra made its debut recording under the label Philips in 1978. Its repertoire includes Butterfly Lovers' Violin Concerto and selected Chinese orchestral works, under the baton of Hans Gunther Mommer. In the 1980s, the orchestra made a serious recording for HK Records. Recordings were also made for the label Marco Polo after Klaus Heymann founded Naxos.

Under the directorship of David Atherton, several recordings were released on Virgin Classics and GMN. In 1997, the orchestra was featured in Tan Dun's album Heaven Earth Mankind: Symphony 1997 (Sony Classical Records), as a celebration for the handover of Hong Kong.

The orchestra started a four-year project in 2015, making it the first Hong Kong and mainland Chinese orchestra to perform Wagner's The Ring of the Nibelung. The four operas will be performed, one per year, in concert and recorded live for the Naxos label.

Each year the orchestra holds a crossover concert with selected cantopop singers. Live recordings are made after each production. Since the concert of Michael Kwan (conducted by Joseph Koo) in 1982, the most successful one has been the live recording of the concert with Jacky Cheung (conducted by Wing-Sie Yip) in 1996.

Performance venues 
After the reorganization from the Sino-British Orchestra into the Hong Kong Philharmonic Orchestra in 1957, the orchestra played the first concert in Loke Yew Hall, the University of Hong Kong. Hong Kong City Hall Concert Hall was the performance venue of the orchestra in its early years. The orchestra was the first to perform in the Hong Kong Cultural Centre after the venue's opening in 1989, participating in the International Celebration of the Arts, which was a festival to open the centre. Since then, Hong Kong Philharmonic has been the most frequent orchestra to perform in the venue. The orchestra officially became the venue partner of Hong Kong Cultural Centre in 2009.

The orchestra also gives an annual outdoor performance, Symphony Under the Stars, Hong Kong's largest outdoor symphonic concert, which attracts thousands of participants every year. Venues include the Happy Valley Racecourse and the New central Harbourfront.

Conductors

Sino-British Orchestra (1947–1957)
 1947–1953 Solomon Bard
 1953–1957 Arrigo Foa

Hong Kong Philharmonic Orchestra (1957-Present)

Music Directors (amateur era)
 1957–1969 Arrigo Foa
 1969–1974 Kek-tjiang Lim

Music Directors (professional era)
 1974–1975 Kek-tjiang Lim
 1975–1978 Hans-Gunther Mommer
 1979–1981 Ling Tung 
 1984–1989 Kenneth Schermerhorn
 1989–2000 David Atherton
 2000–2003 Samuel Wong 
 2003–2005 Samuel Wong (Principal Conductor)
 2004–2012 Edo de Waart (Artistic Director & Chief Conductor)
 2012–2024 Jaap van Zweden

Conductor Laureate
 2000–2009 David Atherton

Principal Guest Conductors
 1982–1985 Maxim Shostakovich
 1984–1993 Kenneth Jean 
 2015– Yu Long

Resident Conductors
 1984–1986 John-Szicheng Lau 
 1986–2000 Wing-sie Yip 
 2005–2006 Harmen Cnossen
 2020-2024 Lio Kuokman

Assistant Conductors
 2008–2010 Perry So
 2016–2018 Vivian Ip
 2016–2018 Gerard Salonga

Associate Conductors
 2010–2012 Perry So

References

External links
Hong Kong Philharmonic Orchestra official website

Hong Kong orchestras
1947 establishments in Hong Kong
Musical groups established in 1947